is a passenger railway station in the city of Minamibōsō, Chiba Prefecture, Japan, operated by the East Japan Railway Company (JR East).

Lines
Chitose Station is served by the Uchibō Line, and is located 98.6 km from the western terminus of the line at Soga Station.

Station layout
The station is an at-grade station with a single side platform serving bidirectional traffic. The station is unattended.

History
Chitose Station was opened on May 20, 1927 as a temporary stop. It was elevated to a full station on August 1, 1930. The station was absorbed into the JR East network upon the privatization of the Japan National Railways (JNR) on April 1, 1987. A new station building was completed in February 2007.

Passenger statistics
In fiscal 2006, the station was used by an average of 62 passengers daily.

Surrounding area
 
 Chikura onsen

See also
 List of railway stations in Japan

References

External links

 JR East Station information  

Railway stations in Chiba Prefecture
Railway stations in Japan opened in 1930
Uchibō Line
Minamibōsō